The Individual normal hill/10 km competition at the FIS Nordic World Ski Championships 2023 was held on 25 February 2023.

Results

Ski jumping
The ski jumping part was held at 10:00.

Cross-country skiing
The race was started at 15:40.

References

Individual normal hill/10 km